Ahmed Musa Jouda (born 20 May 1957) is a retired Sudanese long-distance runner who specialized in the 10,000 metres.

He won the bronze medal at the 1982 African Championships, and competed at the 1983 World Championships without reaching the final. At the 1984 Olympic Games he finished tenth in a career best time of 28:20.26 minutes.

His personal best time on the 5000 metres was 13:34.13 minutes, achieved in July 1985 in Nice.

Achievements

References
 

1957 births
Living people
Sudanese male long-distance runners
Athletes (track and field) at the 1984 Summer Olympics
Athletes (track and field) at the 1988 Summer Olympics
Olympic athletes of Sudan
World Athletics Championships athletes for Sudan